Ohileshwara is a 1956 Kannada-language film directed by T.V. Singh Tagore. The film starred Rajkumar and Kalyan Kumar. It had Narasimharaju, G.V. Iyer and H. R. Shastry in supporting roles.

The film marks the first time singer P. B. Srinivas sung for Rajkumar. Rajkumar and G.K. Venkatesh too turned singers with this movie.

Cast
 Rajkumar as Ohila
 Kalyan Kumar
 Narasimharaju as Shukha
 G. V. Iyer
 H. R. Shastry
 Sriranjini
 Meenakshi

Soundtrack
The music of Ohileshwara was composed by G. K. Venkatesh and lyrics were written by K. R. Seetharama Sastry, and Vijaya Narasimha.

References

External links
 

1956 films
1950s Kannada-language films
Films scored by G. K. Venkatesh
Indian drama films
1956 drama films
Indian black-and-white films